Sevda Alekperzadeh (born July 4, 1977) is an Azerbaijani singer.

Sevda's grandfather, Abulgasan Alekperzade, is a national writer of Azerbaijan and author of the first Azerbaijani novel written in the Soviet period. Her father, Chingiz Alekperzade, was a journalist and writer.

Sevda's voice is difficult to mix up with someone else's: it's strong and thick, with special guttural notes. And this is notwithstanding the fact that her style of singing embraces many possible elements: you can discern in it both soul music and jazz, new wave, and even African griots. Sevda was interested in trying to learn everything: both techniques of traditional "khanende" singing (lessons of legendary singer Alim Gasimov proved a help) and opera bel canto (she went for probation period to Florence, Italy in 2005 not in vain). The most important feature that has always characterized the singer's performance is a high degree of emotional contribution which cannot leave you indifferent. Sevda Alekperzade comes from a family where culture was objective and predestination of everybody. Her grandfather - Abulgasan Alekperzade is a national writer of Azerbaijan and author of the first Azerbaijani novel written in the Soviet period. Her father, Chingiz Alekperzade, was a famous journalist-writer. She and her sister started to take a great interest in singing from childhood. When Sevda was only 14 and Elmira - 18, they came to Aypara group that was formed and led by Vagif.

References

1977 births
Living people
21st-century Azerbaijani women singers
Musicians from Baku
Azerbaijani jazz musicians
Azerbaijani women singer-songwriters